Sábado is a Portuguese weekly news magazine published in Portugal. It is the first modern news magazine in the country.

History and profile
Sábado was established in 1988 and closed down in 1993. The magazine was relaunched by Cofina on 7 May 2004. It is published on a weekly basis and covers news on politics, society, culture, sports and leisure.

The 2005 circulation of Sábado was 48,737 copies. The weekly had a circulation of 65,000 copies in 2007. Its circulation was 76,924 copies in 2010 and 74,431 copies in 2011. It was 66,456 copies in 2012. The magazine had a circulation of 57,261 copies between September and October 2013.

See also
 List of magazines in Portugal

References

External links
Official website 

1988 establishments in Portugal
Magazines established in 1988
Magazines published in Lisbon
Portuguese-language magazines
News magazines published in Portugal
Weekly magazines published in Portugal